The 1998 South Australian Soccer Federation season was the 92nd season of soccer in South Australia.

1998 SASF Premier League

The 1998 South Australian Premier League season was the top level domestic association football competition in South Australia for 1998. It was contested by 10 teams in a single 18 round league format, each team playing all of their opponents twice.

Finals

1998 SASF State League

The 1998 South Australian State League season was the second highest domestic level association football competition in South Australia. It was contested by 12 teams in a 22 round league format, each team playing all of their opponents twice. West Adelaide and Adelaide City refused to take part in the finals series.

Finals

See also
National Premier Leagues South Australia
Football Federation South Australia

References

1998 in Australian soccer
Football South Australia seasons